() is a Spanish exclave and rocky tied island, in the western Mediterranean Sea, connected to the Moroccan shore by a sandy isthmus. It is also connected to a smaller islet to the east, La Isleta, by a rocky isthmus. The tied island was named  (Rock of Badis) and was connected to the town of Badis.

It is administered by the Spanish central government and has a population consisting only of a small number of Spanish military personnel.

Geography

It was a natural island in the Alboran Sea until 1934, when a huge thunderstorm washed large quantities of sand into the short channel between the island and the African continent.

History

Portugal and Spain passed an agreement in 1496 in which they effectively established their zones of influence on the North African coast. This restriction ended with the Iberian Union of Portugal and Spain in 1580 under Philip II after the 1578 Battle of Alcácer Quibir, when Spain started to take direct actions in Morocco, as in the occupation of Larache.

In 1508, Spain launched a successful expedition under the command of Pedro Navarro to take the  located near Badis, held by pirates who were constantly attacking and looting the coast of Southern Spain.

The Ottomans used it as a base for corsairs operating in the region of the Strait of Gibraltar. The Sa'di sultan Abdallah al-Ghalib was alarmed by this activity, fearing that the Ottomans might use the town of Badis as a base from which to undertake the conquest of Morocco. The Moroccan population retired to the kasbah of Senada.

In 2012, the territory was assaulted by a group of Moroccan activists belonging to the Committee for the Liberation of Ceuta and Melilla, whose leader was Yahya Yahya.

Government
 is governed by direct rule from Madrid.

Transportation
The territory is reached primarily by helicopter via a helipad located on the upper sections.

See also
 Former island
 List of Spanish colonial wars in Morocco
 List of islands of Spain
 Morocco–Spain border
 Plazas de soberanía
 Spanish Protectorate of Morocco
 European enclaves in North Africa before 1830

References

External links
 Spanish Autonomous Communities at WorldStatesmen.org

Former islands
Peninsulas of Spain
Mediterranean islands
Plazas de soberanía
Velez de la Gomera
Sea forts
Tombolos
Enclaves and exclaves